Fernand LeBlanc (born  January 12, 1956 in Baie-Comeau, Quebec) is a Canadian former professional ice hockey player who played 34 games in the National Hockey League with the Detroit Red Wings between 1976 and 1978. The rest of his career, which lasted from 1976 to 1989, was mainly spent in the Swiss National League B. As a youth, he played in the 1967 Quebec International Pee-Wee Hockey Tournament with a minor ice hockey team from Baie-Comeau.

Career statistics

Regular season and playoffs

International

References

External links
 

1956 births
Living people
Canadian ice hockey left wingers
Cincinnati Stingers draft picks
Detroit Red Wings draft picks
Detroit Red Wings players
ECH Chur players
HC Ajoie players
Ice hockey people from Quebec
Kalamazoo Wings (1974–2000) players
Kansas City Red Wings players
People from Baie-Comeau
SC Herisau players
Sherbrooke Castors players